The Mangler 2 (also known as The Mangler 2: Graduation Day) is a 2002 Canadian horror film and a direct-to-video sequel to the 1995 theatrical release The Mangler, which was based on a 1972 short story of the same name by Stephen King. It stars Lance Henriksen and Chelse Swain. While the original was about a demon-possessed industrial laundry-machine, this film places the demon in a private school's computer network, where it manifests as a destructive computer virus with some of the same abilities as a ouija board.

The film was critically panned for, among other things, its similarity to another King adaptation, The Lawnmower Man (whose producers King sued to remove his name from the marketing, given its threadbare connection to his original story), and lack of relevance to its predecessor.

Plot 
Joanne 'Jo' Newton, a girl desperate for attention from her workaholic father, ends up going to an upper class private boarding school after a break in at her dad's computer company. The school is getting ready to install a new security system. Jo and several others students are to remain behind while the others leave for Spring Break, as punishment from the school's Dean, Headmaster Bradeen (Lance Henriksen). However, Jo, with her knowledge of computers, has hacked into the school's mainframe and unleashed a super virus called "Mangler 2.0" in the security system.

What nobody knows is that this virus literally has a mind of its own, and it controls everything around the school. At first, everybody thinks it is a blessing, but when the virus starts killing everyone in sight, the remaining students and staff attempt to escape from the building, which proves very difficult, as the virus is watching their every move. Jo's friend, Bradeen, has been captured by one of the computers, with wires being planted into his head. The virus controls his movements, and turns him into a walking computer. With Bradeen at the virus' bidding, he is forced to go after the students.

Jo finally confronts the monster she unleashed which is now in the school's basement. Jo tricks the virus by distracting Bradeen with a non-violent program on creating new lives, featuring snowflakes. Then, she stabs him and pushes him against the supercomputer that he now no longer controls. The virus itself is destroyed as Bradeen dies. Jo managed to end the carnage and escape with her bodyguard Paul, the chef, and her father.

Jo later went on Spring Break in Europe. The camera shows her getting a call from her father. After her phone call ends, a strange and familiar message appeared on the screen of Jo's cellphone saying "you've been mangled", which means that the virus is still alive.

Cast 
 Lance Henriksen as Headmaster Bradeen
 Chelse Swain as Joanne Newton
 Philippe Bergeron as Chef Lecours
 Dexter Bell as Will Walsh
 Daniella Evangelista as Emily Stone
 Miles Meadows as Corey Banks
 Will Sanderson as Dan Channa
 Jeff Doucette as Janitor Bob
 David Christensen as Paul Cody
 Ken Camroux-Taylor as Mr. Newton
 Garvin Cross as Mr. Vessey
 Brenda Campbell as Ms. Shaw
 Shawn Reis as Mr. Walsh
 David Horner as Voice of The Mangler

Critical reception 
The Mangler 2 received very negative reviews from critics and fans alike. It was criticized for its plot (which some see as being similar to that of The Lawnmower Man),  the acting (with the exception of Henriksen's) and how it bore no relation whatsoever to the first film. AllMovie wrote: "Hardly a sequel to the Tobe Hooper version, [...] which wasn't all that good in the first place, The Mangler 2 showcases nothing but teen-horror genre shortcomings".

References

External links 
 

American science fiction horror films
2002 films
Direct-to-video sequel films
Direct-to-video horror films
Films set in universities and colleges
2000s English-language films
2000s American films